The decade of the 1720s in archaeology involved some significant events.

Explorations
 1722: Dutch explorer Jacob Roggeveen arrives at Easter Island.

Excavations
 Formal excavations continue at Pompeii.

Finds
 1723: Roman inscribed stone found in Chichester, England.
 1725: Rudge Cup found in England.
 1727: Gilt bronze head from cult statue of Sulis Minerva from the Temple at Bath, England, found by workmen excavating a sewer.

Publications
 1723: Antoine de Jussieu publishes De l'Origine et des usages de la Pierre de Foudre on the origins of fossils, prehistoric stone tools and meteorites.

Births
 1721: Nicholas Revett (d. 1804)
 1726: October 12 - Pierre Henri Larcher (d. 1812)
 1729: 25 September - Christian Gottlob Heyne, German archaeologist (d. 1812)

References

Archaeology by decade
Archaeology